Morrison v Upper Hutt City Council [1998] 2 NZLR 331, [1998] NZRMA 224 is a cited case in New Zealand regarding negligence claims against the government.

Background
After first granting Morrison a building consent to build a new town house, the UHCC later withdrew the consent after discovering it had been issued outside of the District Plan.

Morrison appealed successfully to the Environment Court, and subsequently sought damages from the council.

Held
The court ruled that a council had no liability for making what is a quasi judicial decision.

References

Court of Appeal of New Zealand cases
New Zealand tort case law
1998 in New Zealand law
1998 in case law
Upper Hutt